Sincebyman was a five-piece American band from Milwaukee, Wisconsin, founded in 1999. Their debut full-length album, We Sing the Body Electric, was released on November 30, 2002. This was followed by A Love Hate Relationship (Revelation Records, 2004), a 4-song EP, and Pictures from the Hotel Apocalypse (Revelation Records, 2005), their final full length on Revelation Records. Following Pictures from the Hotel Apocalypse, their contract with Revelation ended and the band was supposedly writing songs for a new album. On March 9, 2008, they disbanded according to a MySpace bulletin from the band. Their last show was in their hometown of Milwaukee on April 26, 2008.

During their career, the band shared the stage with the likes of The Dillinger Escape Plan, The Rapture, International Noise Conspiracy, The Locust, Underøath, Glass Candy, Isis, The Fall of Troy, Bear vs. Shark, The Bled, Protest the Hero, As Cities Burn, Fear Before the March of Flames, Poison the Well, and Andrew WK.

Sincebyman's name comes from the title of the 46th Movement of Händel's Messiah: "Since by Man came Death".

Band members 

Current
 Sam Macon – vocals
 Brad Clifford – guitar
 Kevin Herwig – guitar
 Eric Alonso – bass
 Jon Kraft – drums

Former
 Justin Kay – guitar
 Bryan Jerabek – bass
 Reed Schuster – bass
 Kenny – bass
 Andy Menchal – bass (one show only @ Milwaukee Metalfest)

Discography

Albums 
We Sing the Body Electric (Revelation, 2002)
Pictures from the Hotel Apocalypse (Revelation Records, 2005)

EPs 
A Love Hate Relationship (Revelation Records, 2004)

Split albums 
With Arms Still Empty/Since By Man – A Split (Kill You for a Dollar, 2000)
Seven Days of Samsara/Since By Man – Why Don't You Set This on Fire (Harmless Records, 2000)

7 inch 
Start Kit to Promote the Destruction of Adulthood (World Wont Listen, 2001)

External links 
 Official band website
 Revelation Records website
 Sincebyman on MySpace
 Sincebyman on Purevolume
 Interview with guitarist Brad Clifford
Sincebyman lyrics

Metalcore musical groups from Wisconsin
American mathcore musical groups
American post-hardcore musical groups